Sansanosmilus is an extinct genus of carnivorous mammal of the family Barbourofelidae (false saber-tooth cats) endemic to Europe, which lived during the Miocene, 13.6—11.1 mya, existing for approximately .

Taxonomy

Sansanosmilus is a member of the family Barbourofelidae, a group of feliform carnivorans related to either felids or nimravids. It had short legs, was very muscular and had a long tail. Sansanosmilus was 1.5 m long and probably weighed around 80 kg. In 1961, paleontologist L. Ginsburg concluded that Sansanosmilus was possessed of a plantigrade walking stance, after studying its foot bones and comparing it with those of the true felid Pseudaelurus from the same site. This is different from later barbourofelids, which are believed to have had semi-plantigrade or semi-digitigrade stances.

The type species, Sansanosmilus palmidens, is known from fossils from the Orleanian and Astaracian stages in France. Although Albanosmilus was seen as a junior synonym of Sansanosmilus from the 1970s onwards, Robles et al. (2013) demonstrated that the type species of Albanosmilus, S. jourdani (which they considered to be a senior synonym of S. vallesiensis), is more closely related to Barbourofelis than to the type species of Sansanosmilus and thus generically distinct. Wang et al. (2020) agreed with Robles et al. (2013) in recovering Albanosmilus as closer to Barbourofelis than to Sansanosmilus.

References

Barbourofelidae
Miocene carnivorans
Tortonian extinctions
Prehistoric mammals of Europe
Prehistoric mammals of Asia
Serravallian first appearances
Fossil taxa described in 1929
Prehistoric carnivoran genera